Eastern Counties 4 was an English level 12 Rugby Union league that was divided into two regional divisions - north and south - with teams from Cambridgeshire, Norfolk, Suffolk and Essex taking part. Promoted teams used to move up to the relevant division in Eastern Counties 3 and relegation was to Eastern Counties 5 until that division was cancelled at the end of the 1996–97 season.  The league was originally abolished in 1999–00 due to East Counties restructuring and teams moved up to higher divisions, only to be reinstated in 2014-15 due to further league restructuring that allowed more 2nd and 3rd teams to take part.  It was abolished again at the end of the 2016–17 season.

Original teams
When league rugby began in 1987 this division contained the following teams:

Campion
Clacton
Fakenham
Felixstowe
Gothic
Mayfield Old Boys
NELPOB
Old Bealonians
Old Palmerians
Rayleigh
Stowmarket

East Counties 4 honours

Eastern Counties 4 (1987–1993)

The original Eastern Counties 4 was a tier 11 league with promotion up to Eastern Counties 3 and relegation down to Eastern Counties 5.

Eastern Counties 4 (1993–1996)

The creation of National 5 South meant that Eastern Counties 4 dropped from a tier 11 league to a tier 12 league for the years that National 5 South was active.  Promotion and relegation continued to Eastern Counties 3 and Eastern Counties 5 respectively.

Eastern Counties 4 (1996–1997)

The cancellation of National 5 South at the end of the 1995–96 season meant that Eastern Counties 4 reverted to being a tier 11 league.  Promotion continued to Eastern Counties 3, while the cancellation of Eastern Counties 5 at the end of the 1996–97 meant there would be no relegation.

Eastern Counties 4 (1997–2000)

Ahead of the 1997–98 season Eastern Counties 4 was split into two regional divisions - north and south - with both divisions remaining as tier 11 leagues.  Promotion continued to Eastern Counties 3 - now also regionalised into north and south divisions - while the cancellation of Eastern Counties 5 at the end of the 1996–97 season meant there was no relegation.  At the end of the 1999–00 season Eastern Counties 4 was cancelled and the majority of teams transferred into Eastern Counties 3.

Eastern Counties 4 (2014–2017)

After an absence of thirteen years, Eastern Counties 4 was re-introduced as a tier 12 league ahead of the 2014–15 season, split into two regional divisions - north and south.  Promotion was to one of the regional divisions in Eastern Counties 3 - north, south or west - and there was no relegation.  Eastern Counties 4 was cancelled for the second time at the end of the 2016–17 season.

Number of league titles

Haverhill & District (2)
Bancroft (1)
Beccles (1)
Billericay (1)
Brightlingsea (1)
Campion (1)
Colchester IV (1)
Fakenham II (1)
Felixstowe (1)
Hadleigh (1) 
Hadleigh II (1)
London Hospital (1)
March (1)
Millwall (1)
Old Brentwoods (1)
Southwold II (1)
Swaffham II (1)
Thames Sports (1)
Thetford II (1)
Wisbech (1)
Witham (1)

See also
London & SE Division RFU
Eastern Counties RU
Essex RFU
English rugby union system
Rugby union in England

Notes

References

Defunct rugby union leagues in England
Rugby union in Essex
Rugby union in Cambridgeshire
Rugby union in Norfolk
Rugby union in Suffolk